Yūichi Sugita was the defending champion but chose not to defend his title.

Yasutaka Uchiyama won the title after defeating Tatsuma Ito 2–6, 6–3, 6–4 in the final.

Seeds

Draw

Finals

Top half

Bottom half

References
Main Draw
Qualifying Draw

Keio Challenger - Men's Singles
2018 Men's Singles
2018 Keio Challenger